The Keota Community School District, or Keota Community Schools, is a rural public school district serving the towns of Keota and Harper and surrounding areas in eastern Keokuk and western Washington counties.

The school, which serves all grade levels PreK-12 in one building, is located at 505 N Ellis Street in Keota.

The school's mascot is the Eagle. Their colors are purple and gold.

Schools
Keota Elementary School
Keota High School

Athletics 
The Eagles compete in the South Iowa Cedar League Conference in the following sports:

Cross Country (boys and girls)
Volleyball (girls)
Football (boys) (jointly with Sigourney Community School District as Sigourney/Keota)
State Champions - 1995, 2001, 2005 (as Sigourney/Keota)
Basketball (boys and girls)
Boys' State Champions 1989
Wrestling (boys and girls)
Track and Field (boys and girls)
Golf (boys and girls)
Baseball (boys)
Softball (girls)

See also
List of school districts in Iowa
List of high schools in Iowa

References

External links
 Keota Community School District

Education in Keokuk County, Iowa
Education in Washington County, Iowa
School districts in Iowa